British Standards (BS) are the standards produced by the BSI Group which is incorporated under a royal charter and which is formally designated as the national standards body (NSB) for the UK. The BSI Group produces British Standards under the authority of the charter, which lays down as one of the BSI's objectives to:

Formally, as stated in a 2002 memorandum of understanding between the BSI and the United Kingdom Government, British Standards are defined as:

Products and services which BSI certifies as having met the requirements of specific standards within designated schemes are awarded the Kitemark.

History 
BSI Group began in 1901 as the Engineering Standards Committee, led by James Mansergh, to standardize the number and type of steel sections, in order to make British manufacturers more efficient and competitive. Over time the standards developed to cover many aspects of tangible engineering, and then engineering methodologies including quality systems, safety and security.

British Standards creation 
The BSI Group as a whole does not produce British Standards, as standards work within the BSI is decentralized. The governing board of BSI establishes a Standards Board. The Standards Board does little apart from setting up sector boards (a sector in BSI parlance being a field of standardization such as ICT, quality, agriculture, manufacturing, or fire).  Each sector board, in turn, constitutes several technical committees. It is the technical committees that, formally, approve a British Standard, which is then presented to the secretary of the supervisory sector board for endorsement of the fact that the technical committee has indeed completed a task for which it was constituted.

Standards 
The standards produced are titled British Standard XXXX[-P]:YYYY where XXXX is the number of the standard, P is the number of the part of the standard (where the standard is split into multiple parts) and YYYY is the year in which the standard came into effect. BSI Group currently has over 27,000 active standards. Products are commonly specified as meeting a particular British Standard, and in general, this can be done without any certification or independent testing. The standard simply provides a shorthand way of claiming that certain specifications are met, while encouraging manufacturers to adhere to a common method for such a specification.

The Kitemark can be used to indicate certification by BSI, but only where a Kitemark scheme has been set up around a particular standard. It is mainly applicable to safety and quality management standards. There is a common misunderstanding that Kitemarks are necessary to prove compliance with any BS standard, but in general, it is neither desirable nor possible that every standard be 'policed' in this way.

Following the move on harmonization of the standard in Europe, some British Standards are gradually being superseded or replaced by the relevant European Standards (EN).

Status of standards 

Standards are continuously reviewed and developed and are periodically allocated one or more of the following status keywords.

Confirmed - the standard has been reviewed and confirmed as being current.
Current - the document is the current, most recently published one available.
Draft for public comment/DPC - a national stage in the development of a standard, where wider consultation is sought within the UK.
Obsolescent - indicating by amendment that the standard is not recommended for use for new equipment, but needs to be retained to provide for the servicing of equipment that is expected to have a long working life, or due to legislative issues.
Partially replaced - the standard has been partially replaced by one or more other standards.
Proposed for confirmation - the standard is being reviewed and it has been proposed that it is confirmed as the current standard.
Proposed for obsolescence - the standard is being reviewed and it has been proposed that it is made obsolescent.
Proposed for withdrawal - the standard is being reviewed and it has been proposed that it is withdrawn.
Revised - the standard has been revised.
Superseded - the standard has been replaced by one or more other standards.
Under review - the standard is under review.
Withdrawn - the document is no longer current and has been withdrawn.
Work in hand - there is work being undertaken on the standard and there may be a related draft for public comment available.

Examples

BS 0 A standard for standards specifies development, structure and drafting of standards.
BS 1 Lists of rolled sections for structural purposes
BS 2 Specification and sections of tramway rails and fishplates
BS 3 Report on influence of gauge length and section of test bar on the percentage of elongation
BS 4 Specification for structural steel sections
BS 5 Report on locomotives for Indian railways 
BS 7 Dimensions of copper conductors insulated annealled, for electric power and light
BS 9 Specifications for Bull Head railway rails
BS 11 Specifications and sections of Flat Bottom railway rails
BS 12 Specification for Portland Cement
BS 15 Specification for structural steel for bridges, etc., and general building construction
BS 16 Specification for telegraph material (insulators, pole fittings, et cetera)
BS 17 Interim report on electrical machinery
BS 22 Report on effect of temperature on insulating materials
BS 24 Specifications for material used in the construction of standards for railway rolling stock
BS 26 Second report on locomotives for Indian Railways (Superseding No 5) 
BS 27 Report on standard systems of limit gauges for running fits
BS 28 Report on nuts, bolt heads and spanners
BS 31 Specification for steel conduits for electrical wiring
BS 32 Specification for steel bars for use in automatic machines
BS 33 Carbon filament electric lamps
BS 34 Tables of BS Whitworth, BS Fine and BS Pipe Threads
BS 35 Specification for Copper Alloy Bars for use in Automatic Machines 
BS 36 Report on British Standards for Electrical Machinery
BS 37 Specification for Electricity Meters 
BS 38 Report on British Standards Systems for Limit Gauges for Screw Threads
BS 42 Report on reciprocating steam engines for electrical purposes
BS 43 Specification for charcoal iron lip-welded boiler tubes
BS 45 Report on Dimensions for Sparking Plugs (for Internal Combustion Engines)
BS 47 Steel Fishplates for Bullhead and Flat Bottom Railway Rails, Specification and Sections of 
BS 49 Specification for Ammetres and Voltmetres
BS 50 Third Report on Locomotives for Indian Railways (Superseding No. 5 and 26) 
BS 53 Specification for Cold Drawn Weldless Steel Boiler Tubes for Locomotive Boilers
BS 54 Report on Screw Threads, Nuts and Bolt Heads for use in Automobile Construction
BS 56 Definitions of Yield Point and Elastic Limit
BS 57 Report on heads for Small Screws
BS 70 Report on Pneumatic Tyre Rims for automobiles, motorcycles and bicycles
BS 72 British Standardisation Rules for Electrical Machinery, 
BS 73 Specification for Two-Pin Wall Plugs and Sockets (Five-, Fifteen- and Thirty-Ampere) 
BS 76 Report of and Specifications for Tar and Pitch for Road Purposes 
BS 77 Specification. Voltages for a.c. transmission and distribution systems
BS 80 Magnetos for automobile purposes
BS 81 Specification for Instrument Transformers
BS 82 Specification for Starters for Electric Motors
BS 84 Report on Screw Threads (British Standard Fine), and their Tolerances (Superseding parts of Reports Nos. 20 and 33) 
BS 86 Report on Dimensions of Magnetos for Aircraft Purposes 
BS 153 Specification for Steel Girder Bridges
BS 308 a now deleted standard for engineering drawing conventions, having been absorbed into BS 8888.
BS 317  for Hand-Shield and Side Entry Pattern Three-Pin Wall Plugs and Sockets (Two Pin and Earth Type)
BS 336 for fire hose couplings and ancillary equipment
BS 372 for Side-entry wall plugs and sockets for domestic purposes (Part 1 superseded BS 73 and Part 2 superseded BS 317)
BS 381 for colours used in identification, coding and other special purposes
BS 476 for fire resistance of building materials/elements
BS 499 Welding terms and symbols. 
BS 546 for Two-pole and earthing-pin plugs, socket-outlets and socket-outlet adaptors for AC (50–60 Hz) circuits up to 250V
BS 857 for safety glass for land transport
BS 970 Specification for wrought steels for mechanical and allied engineering purposes
BS 987C Camouflage Colours
BS 1011 Recommendation for welding of metallic materials
BS 1088 for marine plywood
BS 1192 for Construction Drawing Practice. Part 5 (BS1192-5:1998) concerns Guide for structuring and exchange of CAD data.
BS 1361 for cartridge fuses for a.c. circuits in domestic and similar premises
BS 1362 for cartridge fuses for BS 1363 power plugs
BS 1363 for mains power plugs and sockets
BS 1377 Methods of test for soils for civil engineering.
BS 1572 Colours for Flat Finishes for Wall Decoration
BS 1881 Testing Concrete 
BS 1852 Specification for marking codes for resistors and capacitors
BS 2979 Transliteration of Cyrillic and Greek characters
BS 3621 Thief resistant lock assembly. Key egress.
BS 3943 Specification for plastics waste traps
BS 4142 Methods for rating and assessing industrial and commercial sound
BS 4293 for residual current-operated circuit-breakers
BS 4343 for industrial electrical power connectors
BS 4573 Specification for 2-pin reversible plugs and shaver socket-outlets
BS 4960 for weighing instruments for domestic cookery
BS 5252 for colour-coordination in building construction
BS 5400 for steel, concrete and composite bridges.
BS 5499 for graphical symbols and signs in building construction; including shape, colour and layout
BS 5544 for anti-bandit glazing (glazing resistant to manual attack)
BS 5750 for quality management, the ancestor of ISO 9000
BS 5837 for protection of trees during construction work
BS 5839 for fire detection and alarm systems for buildings
BS 5930 for site investigations
BS 5950 for structural steel
BS 5993 for Cricket balls
BS 6008 for preparation of a liquor of tea for use in sensory tests
BS 6312 for telephone plugs and sockets
BS 6651 code of practice for protection of structures against lightning; replaced by BS EN 62305 (IEC 62305) series.
BS 6879 for British geocodes, a superset of ISO 3166-2:GB
BS 7430 code of practice for earthing
BS 7671 Requirements for Electrical Installations, The IEE Wiring Regulations, produced by the IET.
BS 7799 for information security, the ancestor of the ISO/IEC 27000 family of standards, including 27002 (formerly 17799)
BS 7901 for recovery vehicles and vehicle recovery equipment
BS 7909 Code of practice for temporary electrical systems for entertainment and related purposes
BS 7919 Electric cables. Flexible cables rated up to 450/750 V, for use with appliances and equipment intended for industrial and similar environments
BS 7910 guide to methods for assessing the acceptability of flaws in metallic structures
BS 7925 Software testing
BS 7971 Protective clothing and equipment for use in violent situations and in training
BS 8110 for structural concrete
BS 8233 Guidance on sound insulation and noise reduction in buildings
BS 8484 for the provision of lone worker device services
BS 8485 for the characterization and remediation from ground gas in affected developments
BS 8494 for detecting and measuring carbon dioxide in ambient air or extraction systems
BS 8546  Travel adaptors compatible with UK plug and socket system.
BS 8888 for engineering drawing and technical product specification
BS 15000 for IT Service Management, (ITIL), now ISO/IEC 20000
BS 3G 101 for general requirements for mechanical and electromechanical aircraft indicators
BS EN 12195 Load restraining on road vehicles.
BS EN 60204 Safety of machinery
BS EN ISO 4210 - Cycles. Safety Requirements for Bicycles

PAS documents
BSI also publishes a series of Publicly Available Specification (PAS) documents.

PAS documents are a flexible and rapid standards development model open to all organizations. A PAS is a sponsored piece of work allowing organizations flexibility in the rapid creation of a standard while also allowing for a greater degree of control over the document's development. A typical development time frame for a PAS is around six to nine months. Once published by BSI, a PAS has all the functionality of a British Standard for the purposes of creating schemes such as management systems and product benchmarks as well as codes of practice. A PAS is a living document and after two years the document will be reviewed and a decision made with the client as to whether or not this should be taken forward to become a formal standard. The term PAS was originally an abbreviation for "product approval specification", a name which was subsequently changed to “publicly available specification”. However, according to BSI, not all PAS documents are structured as specifications and the term is now sufficiently well established not to require any further amplification.

Examples

 PAS 78: Guide to good practice in commissioning accessible websites
 PAS 440: Responsible Innovation – Guide 
 PAS 9017: Plastics – Biodegradation of polyolefins in an open-air terrestrial environment – Specification
 PAS 1881: Assuring safety for automated vehicle trials and testing – Specification  
 PAS 1201: Guide for describing graphene material 
 PAS 4444: Hydrogen fired gas appliances – Guide

Availability
Copies of British Standards are sold at the BSI Online Shop or can be accessed via subscription to British Standards Online (BSOL). They can also be ordered via the publishing units of many other national standards bodies (ANSI, DIN, etc.) and from several specialized suppliers of technical specifications.

British Standards, including European and international adoptions, are available in many university and public libraries that subscribe to the BSOL platform. Librarians and lecturers at UK-based subscribing universities have full access rights to the collection while students can copy/paste and print but not download a standard. Up to 10% of the content of a standard can be copy/pasted for personal or internal use and up to 5% of the collection made available as a paper or electronic reference collection at the subscribing university. Because of their reference material status standards are not available for interlibrary loan. Public library users in the UK may have access to BSOL on a view-only basis if their library service subscribes to the BSOL platform. Users may also be able to access the collection remotely if they have a valid library card and the library offers secure access to its resources.

The BSI Knowledge Centre in Chiswick, London can be contacted directly about viewing standards in their Members’ Reading Room.

See also 
 Institute for Reference Materials and Measurements (EU)

References

External links
 Official website

 
1901 establishments in the United Kingdom
International Electrotechnical Commission
Certification marks
Organizations established in 1901